24 Vulpeculae is a single, yellow-hued star in the northern constellation of Vulpecula. It is faintly visible to the naked eye with an apparent visual magnitude of 5.30. It is moving further away with a heliocentric radial velocity of +15 km/s.

This is an evolved giant star with a stellar classification of G8III, having exhausted the hydrogen at its core and moved off the main sequence. It is a red clump giant, indicating it is presently on the horizontal branch and is generating energy through helium fusion in its core region.

24 Vulpeculae is about 251 million years old and is spinning with a projected rotational velocity of 5.02 km/s. It has 3.41 times the mass of the Sun and is radiating 191 times the Sun's luminosity from its enlarged photosphere at an effective temperature of 4,981 K. This is the probable (99.4% chance) source of X-ray emission coming from these coordinates.

References

External links
 

G-type giants
Horizontal-branch stars
Vulpecula
Durchmusterung objects
Vulpeculae, 24
192944
099951
7753